Films produced in Spain in the 2010s ordered by year of release on separate pages:

List of films by year
Spanish films of 2010
Spanish films of 2011
Spanish films of 2012
Spanish films of 2013
Spanish films of 2014
Spanish films of 2015
Spanish films of 2016
Spanish films of 2017
Spanish films of 2018
Spanish films of 2019

External links
 Spanish film at the Internet Movie Database

Spanish
2010s